José Roberto Faria da Silva, known as Roberto Silva (born 22 September 1982) is a Portuguese football player who plays as a centre back.

Club career
He made his professional debut in the Segunda Liga for União da Madeira on 28 December 2011 in a game against Leixões.

References

External links
Roberto Silva at ZeroZero

Living people
1982 births
Sportspeople from Funchal
Association football defenders
Portuguese footballers
C.F. União players
C.D. Santa Clara players
A.D. Camacha players
Liga Portugal 2 players